Mehmet-Can Aydın (born 9 February 2002) is a German professional footballer who plays as a right midfielder for Bundesliga club Schalke 04.

Career
Aydın made his professional debut for Schalke 04 in the Bundesliga on 3 April 2021, starting against Bayer Leverkusen. He was substituted out in the 74th minute for Alessandro Schöpf, with the away match finishing as a 2–1 loss. In January 2022, he extended his contract with Schalke until 2025.

Personal life
Aydın was born in Würselen, North Rhine-Westphalia, and is of Turkish descent.

Career statistics

Honours
Schalke 04
2. Bundesliga: 2021–22

References

External links
 Profile at the FC Schalke 04 website
 
 
 
 

2002 births
Living people
People from Würselen
Sportspeople from Cologne (region)
Footballers from North Rhine-Westphalia
German footballers
Germany youth international footballers
German people of Turkish descent
Association football midfielders
FC Schalke 04 II players
FC Schalke 04 players
Bundesliga players
2. Bundesliga players
Regionalliga players